Arbanitis crispus is a species of armoured trap-door spider in the family Idiopidae, and is endemic to Tasmania. 

It was first described by Ferdinand Karsch in 1878 as Hermeas crispus in 1985 Barbara Main transferred it to Misgolas, and at the same time synonymised it with Dyarcyops scaurus. In 2017, Michael Rix and others
but was transferred to the genus, Arbanitis.

References

Idiopidae
Spiders described in 1878
Spiders of Australia
Fauna of Tasmania
Taxa named by Ferdinand Karsch